St. Mark's Masonic Lodge is a historic Mason's Lodge located at the corner of Queen Street and Grant Street in Baddeck, Nova Scotia. The Lodge was constructed in 1898 to replace a lodge that had been destroyed in a fire. 

The lodge was built in the style of a church, with a central square tower on the front gable and a square tower on the rear elevation. The building features elaborate architectural and Masonic details, however many of these have been covered with modern vinyl siding; Masonic symbols are visible on the tower and transom. 

The Municipality of the County of Victoria declared the lodge as a municipal heritage property in 2007.

See also
Historic Buildings in Baddeck, Nova Scotia
History of Baddeck

References

Buildings and structures in Victoria County, Nova Scotia
Heritage sites in Nova Scotia
Masonic buildings completed in 1898
Masonic buildings in Canada